The following is a summary of the 2016–17 season of competitive football in Switzerland.

Men's national team
The home team is on the left column; the away team is on the right column.

2018 FIFA World Cup qualification

Friendly matches

Women's national team
The home team is on the left column; the away team is on the right column.

UEFA Women's Euro 2017 qualifying

UEFA Women's Euro 2017

2017 Cyprus Cup

Friendly matches

League standings

Raiffeisen Super League

Brack.ch Challenge League

References

 
Seasons in Swiss football